{{Infobox settlement
| name                            = Bemetara
| native_name                     = 
| native_name_lang                = 
| other_name                      = 
| nickname                        = Bemitra
| settlement_type                 = Town
| image_skyline                   = 
| image_alt                       = 
| image_caption                   = 
| pushpin_map                     = India Chhattisgarh#India
| pushpin_label_position          = 
| pushpin_map_alt                 = 
| pushpin_map_caption             = Location in Chhattisgarh, India
| coordinates                     = 
| subdivision_type                = Country
| subdivision_name                = 
| subdivision_type1               = State
| subdivision_name1               = Chhattisgarh
| subdivision_type2               = District
| subdivision_name2               = Bemetara
| established_title               = 
| established_date                = 1जनवरी2012
| area_rank                       = 
| area_total_km2                  = 11.82
| area_footnotes                  = 
| elevation_footnotes             = 
| elevation_m                     = 278
| population_total                = 28536
| population_as_of                = 2011
| population_rank                 = 
| population_density_km2          = auto
| population_demonym              = Bemetarians/Bemetariyas
| population_footnotes            = 
| demographics_type1              = Languages
| demographics1_title1            = Official Language
| demographics1_info1             = Hindi, Chhattisgarhi
| government_type                 = Municipal council
| governing_body                  = Municipal Council of Bemetara
| leader_title                    = President
| leader_name                     =Mr"s.Shakuntala Sahu
Mr. Vijay Sinha (former President)
| unit_pref                       = Metric
| timezone1                       = IST
| utc_offset1                     = +5:30
| postal_code_type                = PIN
| postal_code                     = 491335 (Bemetara)
| area_code_type                  = Telephone code
| area_code                       = 07824
| registration_plate              = CG-25
| website                         = 
| footnotes                       = 
| official_name                   = 
}}

Bemetara is a municipality in  Bemetara district  (formed in 2012 after partition of Durg) of Indian state of Chhattisgarh.

Demographics 
Bemetra is also known as Fauji District.

 2011 census
Bemetara is a city governed by the Bemetara Municipality, Bemetara district, in the state of Chhattisgarh. The total population in Bemetara city/town is 28,536 as per the survey of census during 2011 by Indian Government.
 There are 5,800 House Holds in Bemetara.
 There are 14,280 males (50%);
 There are 14,256 females (50%).
 Scheduled Cast are 2,398 (8%)
 Total Scheduled Tribe are 884 (3%).
 Literates in the city/town are 20,012 (70%).
 There are 8,524 total Illiterates (30%).
 Literates are 20,012 (70%) and total Illiterates 8,524 (30%) in Bemetara.
 Bemetara Workers are 10,923 (38%). ** 9,718 are regular Workers and 1,205 are Irregular Workers.
 There are total of 17,613 Non Workers (62%) in Bemetara.

Being an important regional centre and a city with a history stretching back more than a hundreds years, as attracted people from different parts of Madhya Pradesh and neighbouring states. The population includes local ethnic Chhattisgarhis, North Indians, Maharashtrian(migrated during Peshwa reign), South Indians, and a few people from the North East. Local ethnic Chhattisgarhi comprises Kalar, Kurmi, Swarnkar, Teli, Bramhan, Koshta and Satnami communities. The city is also inhabited by the trading communities like Jayaswals, Baniyas, Agarwals, Jains, Gujaratis, and Marwaris. The city is also home to an immigrant population that includes Sindhis and the Sikhs. Majority of the population in Bemetara is Hindu. Muslims primarily reside in such areas as bajar para masjid gali. City is divided by castewise from local people like Bramhan para, Kurmi para, Panjabi para, Sindhi para etc.

Geography and climate

Geography 
BEMETARA is located near the centre of a large plain, sometimes referred as the "rice bowl of India", where hundreds of varieties of rice are grown.  The Shivnath River flows to the east of the city of bemetara, and the southern side has dense forests.  The Maikal Hills rise on the north-west of Bemetara;
on the north, the land rises and merges with the Chota Nagpur Plateau, which extends north-east across Jharkhand state. On the south of Bemetara lies the Deccan Plateau.

Climate 
Bemetara has a tropical wet and dry climate, temperatures remain moderate throughout the year, except from March to June, which can be extremely hot. The temperature in April–May sometimes
rises above .These summer months also have dry and hot winds. In summers, the temperature can also go up to 50 °C.

City structure 
It is the largest town amongst other towns in the scenario in the land & population, it is also surrounded by trees. The city has a total of 18 wards.

Allons Public School is one of the earliest established CBSE English medium school in the region.Academic World School is the second established CBSE school in Bemetara District and it is the largest school in Bemetara district with a strength of around 2000. It also has hostel facility
for boys and girls.
List of Wards in Nagar Palika Parishad Bemetara :

1*
RAMDAS WARD 	रामदास वार्ड

2*
SARDAR VALLABH BHAI PATEL WARD 	सरदार वल्लभ भाई पटेल वार्ड

3*
SHAHID HEMOO KALANI WARD 	शहीद हेमू कलाणी वार्ड

4*
PT. DINDYAL UPADHYAYA WARD	पं. दीनदयाल उपाध्याय वार्ड

5*
CHANDRASHEKHR AZAD WARD	चन्द्रशेखर आजाद वार्ड

6*
INDIRA GANDHI WARD 	इंदिरा गांधी वार्ड

7*
GURU GOVIND SINGH WARD 	गुरू गोविन्द सिंह वार्ड

8*
DR. BHIMRAV AMBEDKAR WARD	डा.भीमराव अंबेडकर वार्ड

9*
BABA RAMDEV WARD 	बाबा रामदेव वार्ड

10*
SHAHID BHAGAT SINGH WARD 	शहीद भगत सिंह वार्ड

11*
KARMA MATA WARD 	कर्मा माता वार्ड

12*
PT. JAWAHAR LAL NEHRU WARD	पं. जवाहर लाल नेहरू वार्ड

13*
PARSHURAM WARD 	परशुराम वार्ड

14*
RAJIV NAGAR WARD 	राजीव नगर वार्ड

15*
MATA BHADRAKALI WARD 	माता भद्रकाली वार्ड

16*
RAM MANDIR WARD 	राम मंदिर वार्ड

17*
KABEER WARD 	कबीर वार्ड

18*
MASJID WARD 	मस्जिद वार्ड

Administration 
On 1 January 2012, Bemetara became a district Headquarters of Bemetara district. At present Dr. Basaw Raju is Collector of Bemetara and Ms Parul Mathur is the Superintendent of Police and Mr. Ashish Chhabra is currently MLA of Bemetara. President of municipal council is Vijay Sinha

Transportation

Roads 
Bemetara city is well connected to Raipur, Jabalpur, Bilaspur, Durg and Kawardha by roadways. NH-12 A passes through the heart of city which is one of the busiest road in the state. This highway connects state capital Raipur to one of the major city of Madhya Pradesh, Jabalpur. There are two state highway passing through Bemetara that are Durg to Bemetara and Kumhari – Bemetara – Mungeli.

Railway 
There is no railway line in Bemetara district and the nearest Railway station is Tilda(35 km) and major station are Raipur (66 km) and Durg about 72 km .

A new railway line survey has been proposed for Durg-Bemetara-Mungeli-Bilaspur railway line.

References 

Cities and towns in Bemetara district
1907 establishments in India